Under the Red Cloud is the twelfth studio album by Finnish heavy metal band Amorphis, released worldwide on 4 September 2015 through Nuclear Blast. The album was produced by Jens Bogren, who was described as "just the right person" by keyboardist Santeri Kallio. This would be the band's last album with longtime bassist Niklas Etelävuori who left in 2017.

Track listing

Reception

Upon release, the album received critical acclaim. Cryptic Rock reviewed the album, finding that it had more of a focus on melody than the previous album, and it had a wider variety of instruments, which was more in line with the band's pre-2012 work. "The Four Wise Ones" was described as an "instant classic" song, "pure melodic death metal at its finest." Cryptic Rock also saw songs that were heavy metal, folk metal and rock ballads.

Under the Red Cloud debuted at #144 on the Billboard 200 charts, selling 1,600 units in the US in its first week.

Charts

Personnel

Amorphis
 Tomi Joutsen – vocals
 Esa Holopainen – lead guitar; music (2, 6–8 & 10)
 Tomi Koivusaari – rhythm guitar; music (4 & 11)
 Niclas Etelävuori – bass
 Santeri Kallio – keyboards; music (1, 3, 5, 9 & 12), engineering (church organ)
 Jan Rechberger – drums

Miscellaneous Staff
 Chrigel Glanzmann – flute, tin whistle (2, 5, 9 & Winter's Sleep)
 Martin Lopez – percussion (5)
 André Alvinzi – additional keyboards (6)
 Linus Corneliusson – mixing assistance
 Pekka Kainulainen – lyrics
 Valnoir Mortasonge – artwork

Additional Vocalists
 Aleah Stanbridge – backing vocals (2, 6 & 10)
 Jens Bogren – backing vocals, mixing and mastering

Orchestra
 Jon Phipps – additional and strings arrangements
 Österäng Symphonic Orchestra

Engineers
 Lasse Väyrynen – Jan Rechberger's percussion
 David Castillo – Martin Lopez's percussion
 Jyri Riikonen – grand piano, Hammond and Rhodes
 Jonas Olsson 
 Viktor Stenqvist

References

External links
Amorphis - Under the Red Cloud, Sputnik Music review by Oranges

2015 albums
Amorphis albums
Nuclear Blast albums
Albums produced by Jens Bogren